Early Art is an album by trumpeter Art Farmer featuring two sessions recorded in 1954 which was originally released on LP on the New Jazz label in the early 1960s.

Reception

In his review for Allmusic, Scott Yanow said "the music is quite enjoyable and a must for 1950s bop collectors".

Track listing
The programming differs from what is listed, with "Soft Shoe" (which should have been the opener) actually appearing fifth and the songs listed as appearing second through fifth moving up to first through fourth. 
All compositions by Art Farmer except as indicated
 "Confab in Tempo" - 3:54
 "I'll Take Romance" (Oscar Hammerstein II, Ben Oakland) - 4:57
 "Wisteria" - 4:32
 "Autumn Nocturne" (Kim Gannon, Josef Myrow) - 4:05
 "Soft Shoe" - 4:59
 "I've Never Been in Love Before" (Frank Loesser) - 3:49
 "I'll Walk Alone" (Jule Styne, Sammy Cahn) - 3:55
 "Gone With the Wind" (Herbert Magidson, Allie Wrubel) - 4:07
 "Alone Together" (Arthur Schwartz, Howard Dietz) - 3:59
 "Pre Amp" - 3:35
Recorded at Van Gelder Studio in Hackensack, New Jersey on January 20 (tracks 1-3, 5) and November 9 (tracks 4, 6-10), 1954

Personnel
Art Farmer – trumpet
Sonny Rollins - tenor saxophone (tracks 1-3,5)
Horace Silver (tracks 1-3, 5), Wynton Kelly (tracks 4, 6-10)  - piano
Percy Heath (tracks 1-3, 5), Addison Farmer (tracks 4, 6-10)  – bass 
Kenny Clarke (tracks 1-3, 5), Herbie Lovelle (tracks 4, 6-10)  – drums

References 

Prestige Records albums
Art Farmer albums
1962 albums
Albums recorded at Van Gelder Studio
Albums produced by Bob Weinstock